Tom Durkin (born November 30, 1950) is a retired American sportscaster and public address announcer specializing in Thoroughbred horse racing. He was the race caller for NBC Sports from 1984 through 2010, and served as the announcer for the New York Racing Association from 1990 until his retirement in 2014.  For his career-long dedication, he was awarded the Eclipse Award of Merit in January 2015.

Life and career
Durkin was born in Chicago, Illinois. He studied drama at The St. Norbert College in De Pere, Wisconsin. In 1971, he was hired as a race caller at Quarter Horse and Thoroughbred races at county fairs in Wisconsin. He did this each summer through 1975, then the following year was employed by the Daily Racing Form as a call taker responsible for documenting the comments and statistics used in the official charts of the races at Cahokia Downs and Thistledown Racecourse. He went on to work as a race caller at Florida Downs in Oldsmar, Florida, Miles Park (race track) in Louisville, Kentucky, Quad City Downs in East Moline, Illinois, Balmoral Park Racetrack in Crete, Illinois, Hialeah Park Race Track in Hialeah, Florida, Meadowlands Racetrack in East Rutherford, New Jersey, and Gulfstream Park in Hallandale Beach, Florida, and in 1990 was hired to call races at the New York Racing Association's Aqueduct Racetrack, Belmont Park and Saratoga Race Course.

In 1980, Durkin appeared as a contestant on the game show Match Game PM and won $1,000.

Durkin served as the Breeders Cup's chief TV voice from its inception through 2005 and was a longtime broadcaster on NBC as part of the network's sportscasting crew for horse races, providing analysis, commentary and features in addition to the descriptions of races.

Durkin earned fame in this decade from calling the U.S. Triple Crown races for NBC, which took over the coverage of the events in 2001. Due to his contract with NBC, Durkin no longer called Breeders' Cup races, starting from 2006, as those races moved to ESPN. However, he continued calling the Belmont Stakes, which air on ABC, because of his position as the track announcer at Belmont Park.

Like his predecessor, Marshall Cassidy, Durkin was also a TV voice on important stakes races on ESPN beyond the Triple Crown and Breeders' Cup series.

At The Meadowlands, Durkin called the match race in the 1989 Hambletonian Stakes harness race between Park Avenue Joe and Probe; the horses finished in a dead heat, becoming the only co-winners of the prestigious race.

He made a flub during the 2009 Kentucky Derby when he failed to notice the eventual winner, Mine That Bird, take a three-length lead in the home stretch. Durkin kept calling the names of the horses in second and third place and ignored the front runner until just before the horse crossed the finish line.

On April 26, 2011, Durkin announced his decision to not to renew his contract with NBC Sports, citing stress.  On May 10, 2014, Durkin announced that he would retire from his announcer position on August 31, near the end of the 2014 Saratoga meet. He owed his "inexpressible gratitude" to the racing fans and horseplayers in his retirement speech following his final race call.

References

External links
 August 19, 2005 Horseplayer magazine interview with Tom Durkin and Trevor Denman at the NTRA

Public address announcers
Living people
1950 births
People from Chicago
St. Norbert College alumni
American horse racing announcers
Eclipse Award winners